Kelsie Elizabet Ahbe (born July 6, 1991 in Akron, Ohio) is an American-born Canadian pole vaulter.

Kelsie placed 12th at the 2016 Olympics in Rio, coached by Tim Mack, 2004 Olympic Gold Medalist. Kelsie competed in the 2017 and 2019 World Championships. She was coached by Jim Bemiller in 2019. He coached Tim Mack and Lawrence Johnson, among others. At the 2010 World Junior Championships in Athletics she finished 7th competing for the United States.

Domestically, she won the Canadian national championship in 2015.  She took silver at the 2015 NACAC Championships in Athletics and finished 5th at the 2015 Pan American Games.

She has the third best jump in Canadian woman's history.

In July 2016 she was officially named to Canada's Olympic team.

Athletics Canada published a retirement article with Kelsie Ahbe Holahan in January 2021.

References

External links 

1991 births
Living people
Sportspeople from Akron, Ohio
Canadian female pole vaulters
American female pole vaulters
Pan American Games track and field athletes for Canada
Athletes (track and field) at the 2015 Pan American Games
Athletes (track and field) at the 2019 Pan American Games
Athletes (track and field) at the 2016 Summer Olympics
Olympic track and field athletes of Canada
21st-century American women